USS SC-22, during her service life known as USS Submarine Chaser No. 22 or USS S.C. 22, was an SC-1-class submarine chaser built for the United States Navy during World War I. She later served in the United States Coast Guard as USCGC Quigley.

U.S. Navy service
SC-22 was a wooden-hulled 110-foot (34 m) submarine chaser built at the New York Navy Yard at Brooklyn, New York. She was commissioned on 19 October 1917 as USS Submarine Chaser No. 22, abbreviated at the time as USS S.C. 22.

Submarine Chaser No. 22 was transferred to the U.S. Coast Guard on 13 or 14 November 1919 at Norfolk, Virginia.

The U.S. Navy adopted its modern hull number system on 17 July 1920, after Submarine Chaser No. 22 had left Navy service. Had she remained in Navy service at that date, she would have been classified as SC-22 and her name would have been shortened to USS SC-22, and she now is referred to retrospectively by this name.

U.S. Coast Guard service

The Coast Guard commissioned the submarine chaser as USCGC Quigley.

The Coast Guard found Quigley, like other SC-1-class submarine chasers, too expensive to operate and maintain, and sold her on 1 May 1922.

Notes

References 
 

 NavSource Online: Submarine Chaser Photo Archive: USCGC Quigley ex-SC-22
 The Subchaser Archives: The History of U.S. Submarine Chasers in the Great War Hull number: SC-22
 United States Coast Guard Historian's Office: Cutters and Craft: Quigley (1919) ex-SC-22
 Woofenden, Todd A. Hunters of the Steel Sharks: The Submarine Chasers of World War I. Bowdoinham, Maine: Signal Light Books, 2006. .

SC-1-class submarine chasers
World War I patrol vessels of the United States
Ships built in Brooklyn
1917 ships
Ships transferred from the United States Navy to the United States Coast Guard